"Dallas Blues", written by Hart Wand, is an early blues song, first published in 1912. It has been called the first true blues tune ever published. However, two other 12-bar blues had been published earlier: Anthony Maggio's "I Got the Blues" in 1908 and "Oh, You Beautiful Doll", a Tin Pan Alley song whose first verse is twelve-bar blues, in 1911. Also, two other songs with "Blues" in their titles were published in 1912: "Baby Seals Blues" (August 1912), a vaudeville tune written by Franklin "Baby" Seals,  and "The Memphis Blues", written by W.C. Handy (September 1912). Neither, however, were genuine blues songs.

The song, although written in standard blues tempo, is often performed in a ragtime or Dixieland style.

The blues was originally published as an instrumental for piano solo. In its original published version it consists of a single twenty-bar theme (a basic twelve-bar theme with a repeat of the final eight measures) presented twice, the second time in a elaborated ragtime form.  A second edition of the song, also for piano solo, uses the same twenty-bar theme but precedes it with an independent twelve-bar melody.  In 1918, a third version appeared, for voice and piano, with lyrics by Lloyd Garrett to express the singer's longing for Dallas:

The song version uses the two themes of the second version, but reduces the eight-bar repeat on the second theme, so both  are twelve-bar. It is mainly in this third form that the work has become known.

No date is found for the actual composition of "Dallas Blues" but Samuel Charters, who interviewed Wand for his book The Country Blues (1959), states that Wand took the tune to a piano-playing friend, Annabelle Robbins, who arranged the music for him. Charters added that the title came from one of Wand's father's workmen who remarked that the tune gave him the blues to go back to Dallas. Since Wand's father died in 1909, the actual composition must have predated that.

In any case, within weeks of its publication it was heard the length of the Mississippi River, and its influence on all the blues music that followed is well documented.

Early recordings

References

Bibliography
Charters, Samuel B. (1975). The Country Blues. Da Capo Press. .
Davis, Francis. (2003). The History of the Blues: The Roots, the Music, the People. Da Capo Press. .
Duncan, Craig (1994). Blues Fiddling Classics. Mel Bay Publications. .
Jasen, David A. (2002). A Century of American Popular Music: 1899–1999. Routledge. .

Wand, Hart A. (1912). "Dallas Blues". Wand Publishing. From Mississippi State University's Templeton Digital Sheet Music Collection.
Wand, Hart A. (music); Garrett, Lloyd (words) (c. 1918). "Dallas Blues". Frank Root & Company. From the University of Colorado Digital Sheet Music Collection.

Blues songs
1912 songs
Music of Oklahoma